Wednesday Night Heroes (abbreviated as WNH) were a Canadian punk rock band from Edmonton, Alberta, fronted by Graeme MacKinnon. The band released three albums and toured extensively in Canada and the United States.

History
The band was formed in 1997 in Edmonton. They released their first demo in September 1997, which included six songs. In July 2001, they released their first full-length album, which was self-titled.

WNH songs can be found on punk compilations such as Rockin' the Streets Vol. 2, Mayday Records comp, and Punx Unite Vol. 3, and Oi! Let's go Canada.

WNH released their second full-length album on August 19, 2003, Superiority Complex, which includes the song "Music for the People".

They released their third full-length CD (LP) on BYO Records in June, 2007, entitled Guilty Pleasures. The music combined elements of hardcore and street punk.

The Heroes stopped performing in 2009, but got together for a final show on January 25, 2014 in Edmonton.

Discography
Albums
 Wednesday Night Heroes (2001)
 Superiority Complex (2003)
 Guilty Pleasures (2007)

Compilations
Rockin' the Street Vol. 2
Mayday! Records comp
Punx Unite Vol. 3
Oi! Let's go Canada

External links 
 WNH Guitar Tabs
 Official Myspace

References

Musical groups established in 1997
Musical groups from Edmonton
Canadian punk rock groups
BYO Records artists
1997 establishments in Alberta
Musical groups disestablished in 2009
2009 disestablishments in Alberta